Zachariah Kìnùthia (born 10 July 1988), popularly known as Zack Kìnùthia, was the Chief Administrative Secretary, Ministry of Sports, Culture and Heritage between January 2020 and February 2022 when he resigned. He is also a former chairman of Student Organization of Nairobi University (SONU).

Early life and education 
Zack Kìnùthia, the son of Lucy Mugure, was born in Marumī village, Kigumo Ward, Gatitu Constituency, Murang’a County. He hails from the Kikuyu tribe, a Bantu ethnic group. He attended Kigumo Primary School in his home County and later joined Gaichanjiru High School in Murang’a County.  

In 2010, after accomplishing his secondary education, he joined the University of Nairobi, where he pursued a Bachelor’s degree in Economics and Political Science. While at the University of Nairobi, he ventured into student politics and was elected as the SONU chairman. He also served as a Christian Union leader. Zack Kìnùthia is currently pursuing a degree in Law at the same University.

Leadership 
While at UoN, Zack Kìnùthia successfully vied for the chairmanship of the student leadership position for the year 2013–2014, joining previous luminaries like Kabando wa Kabando, Wafula Buke, Mwandawiro Mgangha and Eric Janganya.

In his days of studentship, he was also an active member of Christian Union. He later became the congregation's leader.

Career 
In 2014, after graduating from the University with his first degree, Zack Kìnùthia worked as a research assistant at a community project supporting the fight against HIV/AIDS in Kenya, an initiative of the University of Nairobi, known as Central Kenya Response - Integration, Strengthening and Sustainability plus Project (CRISSP).

In 2013, Zack Kìnùthia joined the presidential campaign in support of the then Presidential candidate Uhuru Kenyatta and later got involved in the formation of Jubilee Party as well as President Uhuru's re-election youth campaign.

Zack Kìnùthia was appointed as the Chief Chief Administrative Secretary for Education on January 15, 2020 by President Uhuru Kenyatta alongside Mumina Bonaya. He was sworn on January 17 of the same year at State House and took the oath of office in the presence of Education Cabinet Secretary, Prof. George Magoha, his present boss. The former UoN VC, Prof. George Magoha describes the CAS as "one of few ethical leaders in the society who is incorruptible".

The CAS commitments include vocational education expansion, the roll-out of the Competency-Based Curriculum (CBC) and the 100% transition from primary to secondary school.

Zack is the first appointee and second to hold the position after Prof. Collete A. Suda, PhD. He is among the youngest leaders to hold a top government position.

Previously, he has been part of the committee of organizers of the National Prayer Breakfast Meeting in the Country and has traveled to the United States for experiential learning courtesy of the US Prayer Breakfast scholarship.

Zack was later moved to the Ministry of Sports, Culture and Heritage. In February 2022, he resigned as the CAS  Ministry of Sports, Culture and Heritage, to contest for the Kigumo parliamentary seat under the Party of national unity (Kenya). He lost the race to Joseph Munyoro of UDA who garnered 27,213 votes against Zack Kinuthia who scored 10,543 votes.

Personal life 
Zack Kìnùthia is a husband and a father to two children.

References 

Living people
1988 births
Kikuyu people
Government ministers of Kenya
21st-century Kenyan politicians
Jubilee Party politicians